The American Muscle Car Museum is a private non-profit museum in Melbourne, Florida. The museum is not open to the general public. Instead, the museum is used for fundraising events for charity. This 123,000 square foot facility displays over 350 muscle cars, many considered rare versions. The collection belongs to Mark Pieloch and the estimated worth is 32 million dollars. Pieloch has collected cars since 1974, and the models in the museum start from 1955, with many from the 1969-70 period.

The museum includes a conservation area to restore cars. The facility is a "green building" to include 100% power from solar energy using 1,200 solar panels.

In addition to automobiles, the collection includes vintage balloon tire bicycles, auto related neon signs, antique gas pumps, jukeboxes, pedal cars, vintage soda coolers, motorcycles.

The museum has conducted several fundraisers for charitable causes, including selling valuable cars from the collection and donating the proceeds.

References

Automobile museums in Florida
Buildings and structures in Melbourne, Florida
Museums in Brevard County, Florida
Muscle cars
Museums established in 2016
Sustainable buildings in the United States
2016 establishments in Florida